The Pilecki Institute is a Polish government institution in care of preserving the memory, documenting and researching the historical experiences of Polish citizens and increasing awareness regarding totalitarianism in the 20th century. Its patron is Witold Pilecki.

The organization has been called Polish Yad Vashem.

Activities

Research 
The Scientific Department initiates and participates in interdisciplinary research projects devoted to totalitarianism and the history of Poland in the 20th century. The Institute gathers researchers who specialize in political science, sociology, history and Jewish studies. It gathers and publishes documents concerning its scope of interests, provides support for scientific research, especially connected to the victims of Nazism and Communism. The studies are concerned primarily with World War II and its consequences. The Institute also translates into Polish the most important works on totalitarianisms.

Education 
The Institute carries out educational projects and events.

Commemoration 
The Pilecki Institute commemorates persons who were murdered for providing aid and assistance to Poles and Jews during the World War II. Under “Called by the Name” project were honoured e..g. Jadwiga Długoborska, Lucyna Radziejowska. On recommendation of the Institute, the President of Poland bestows the Virtus et Fraternitas Medal, the Eastern Cross, and the Western Cross.

Organisation 
The Pilecki Institute was established by the Polish Parliament on 9 November 2017, and following year incorporated the Witold Pilecki Center for Totalitarian Studies. On 2017 the institute was given a one-time lump sum of PLN 75 million (roughly $18.7 million) by the Polish parliament, which was used to launch the institute and cover operational expenses through 2019. In 2020, the institute received a specified-user subsidy of PLN 20 million (roughly $5 million) from the Ministry of Culture and National Heritage. Its aim is to analyse the importance for the history of the 20th century of the Nazi and Soviet totalitarian regimes and the global consequences of their actions. The Institute is supervised by the Minister of Culture and National Heritage.

The Institute is governed by the director – Wojciech Kozłowski. A consultative and advisory body to the Director of the Institute is the Council of Memory whose members are appointed by the Minister of Culture and National Heritage. Amongst them are, e.g.: Grzegorz Berendt, Sławomir Dębski, Jan Ołdakowski, Albert Stankowski. The chairperson is prof. Zofia Zielińska.

The Institute is divided into:

 Department of Archives
 Education Department
 Promotion and Production Team
 Personnel Department
 Research Department
 Publishing Department
 Personal Data Controller
 Accounting Department
 Competitive Tendering
 Film Projects Team
 Translation Team
 Library
 Press Office
 Administrative Department
 Berlin Branch

See also 

 Laws against Holocaust denial

Notes

External links 

 Pilecki Institute Home Page (English)

2017 establishments in Poland
Commemoration of communist crimes
Commemoration of Nazi crimes
History of Poland (1989–present)
History organisations based in Poland
Organizations established in 2017